The 2011 Nigerian Senate election in Osun State was held on April 9, 2011, to elect members of the Nigerian Senate to represent Osun State. Olusola Adeyeye representing Osun Central, Christopher Omoworare Babajide representing Osun East and Mudasiru Oyetunde Hussein representing Osun West all won on the platform of Action Congress of Nigeria.

Overview

Summary

Results

Osun Central 
Action Congress of Nigeria candidate Olusola Adeyeye won the election, defeating other party candidates.

Osun East 
Action Congress of Nigeria candidate Christopher Omoworare Babajide won the election, defeating other party candidates.

Osun West 
Action Congress of Nigeria candidate Mudasiru Oyetunde Hussein won the election, defeating party candidates.

References 

Osun State Senate elections
Osun State senatorial elections
Osun State senatorial elections